The Hungarian Music Awards have been given to artists in the field of Hungarian music since 1992. The award categories are similar to Grammy Awards in the United States and Brit Awards in the United Kingdom.

The awards were known as the Golden Giraffe Awards until 2003. The award is presented by Mahasz, the Hungarian music industry association. The current official name is Fonogram – Hungarian Music Awards.

Categories
The categories may have been added and/or removed in the past.

International categories
Pop-Rock Album of the Year
Modern Pop-Rock Album of the Year
Alternative Music Album of the Year
Hard Rock-Metal Album of the Year
Dance-Pop Album of the Year

Domestic categories
Pop-Rock Album of the Year
Modern Pop-Rock Album of the Year
Alternative Music Album of the Year
Electronic Album of the Year
Hard Rock-Metal Album of the Year
Dance-Pop Album of the Year
Jazz Album of the Year
World Music Album of the Year
Entertainment Music Album of the Year
Children Album of the Year
Newcomer of the Year
Song of the Year
Music DVD of the Year

References

External links
 Fonogram official website

Hungarian music awards
Awards established in 1992
1992 establishments in Hungary